Gudrun Gut (born 20 May 1957) is a German electronic musician, DJ, presenter, music producer and founder of the Monika Enterprise.

She grew up in the Lüneburger Heide and moved to West Berlin in 1975, where she studied visual arts at the Hochschule der Künste from 1978 to 1984. She was an early member of Einstürzende Neubauten and a founding member of music groups Mania D, Malaria! and Matador. She is the head of the labels Monika Enterprise and Moabit Musik. She co-presented the Oceanclub weekly radio program in Berlin with Thomas Fehlmann. Her debut solo album, I Put a Record On was released on 5 February 2007. Music critics saluted the openness and approachability of the music on the record.

According to The Wire magazine's April 2008 issue, which featured Gudrun Gut on the cover, "this 'dilettante' has genially hosted Berlin's new music scene for 30 years".

Works

Selected discography

 1980: White Christmas 7″ (with Tabea Blumenschein, Frieder Butzmann and Bettina Köster)
 1996: YadiYAdi maxi single (with Anita Lane)
 1996: Die Sonne maxi single (with Blixa Bargeld)
 1996: Members of The Ocean Club CD (v. a. with Anita Lane, Danielle de Picciotto, Blixa Bargeld, Jovanka von Willsdorf, Jayney Klimek, Inga Humpe, Myra Davies, Katharina Franck and Manon P. Duursma)
 1996: Firething maxi single (with Anita Lane)
 2004: Members of The Ocean Club double CD (reissue with a remix CD containing mixes from Ellen Allien, Thomas Fehlmann, Effective Force, Ian Pooley, The Orb, Paul van Dyk, Klaus Schulze, Spinout and CoBra)
 2005: Move Me 7″
 2007: I Put A Record On CD
 2007: In Pieces 12″ (remixes from Burger/Voigt, Pole, Dntel) 
 2007: Pleasure Train 7″
 2008: Apples, Pears and Deer in Poland EP
 2010: Baustelle CD (with AGF as Greie Gut Fraktion)
 2011: Rekonstruktion CD (remix CD of the Baustelle record)
 2012: Wildlife CD
 2012: 500m CD (with Jochen Irmler as Gut Und Irlmler)
 2016: Vogelmixe – Gudrun Gut Remixes Heimatlieder aus Deutschland Berlin / Augsburg CD / Vinyl
 2017: Instrumentals For "Sirens" LP (with Beate Bartel)
2018: Moment CD / vinyl / digital

Filmography
 1988: Dandy – directed by Peter Sempel
 1995: Girls Bite Back – directed by Wolfgang Büld
 2005: Verschwende deine Jugend – directed by Benjamin Quabeck
 2015: B-Movie: Lust & Sound in West-Berlin 1979-1989, documentary with Mark Reeder

Radio drama music 
 1991: Paul Zech: Das Trunkene Schiff – directed by Wolfgang Rindfleisch (Radio drama – Funkhaus Berlin)

Bibliography 
 Marke B, Berliner Labels. Verbrecher Verlag ed., Berlin 2002.  (with Thomas Fehlmann and Daniel Meteo).

References

External links 
 
 Gudrun Gut: Memory Podcast (The Wire, April 2008)
 the Ocean Club  
 

Living people
German electronic musicians
German DJs
Einstürzende Neubauten members
1957 births
Women in electronic music
Women new wave singers
Feminist musicians
Electronic dance music DJs